Celebrity Ghost Stories is an American paranormal reality television series that debuted on October 3, 2009, with the pilot airing on September 26, 2009. Its first four seasons aired on The Biography Channel with the fifth airing on Lifetime Movie Network. In June 2019, A&E announced the revival of the series with the sixth-season premiere airing in the fall of the same year. Celebrity Ghost Stories interviews various celebrities who talk about paranormal events that have happened in their lives. A spin-off, The Haunting Of, features footage from the series and follows the celebrities as they go back to the places of their haunted experiences to find out the truth.

On February 18, 2020, it was announced that the sixth season would premiere on April 8, 2020. However, the new series was formatted to follow along the lines of "The Haunting Of" with psychic medium Kim Russo taking celebrities back to the scenes of their encounters, rather than the original series format of different celebrities telling stories of their own paranormal encounters.

Episodes

Pilot
Belinda Carlisle, Sammy Hagar, Ernie Hudson and Gina Gershon

Season 1
Joan Rivers, Scott Baio, Teri Polo and David Carradine – October 3, 2009
Carnie Wilson, Eric Roberts, Elisabeth Röhm and C. Thomas Howell – October 10, 2009
Carrie Fisher, Rue McClanahan, John Waters and Federico Castelluccio – October 17, 2009
Lisa Rinna, Jeffrey Ross, Vincent Curatola and Illeana Douglas – October 24, 2009
Tom Arnold, Dee Snider, Carnie Wilson and Nia Long – November 7, 2009
Barry Williams, Debi Mazar, Greg Grunberg and Sammy Hagar – November 14, 2009
Traci Lords, Jay Thomas, Justine Bateman and James Kyson Lee – November 21, 2009
Morgan Fairchild, John Salley, Lili Taylor and Vincent Curatola – December 5, 2009
Anson Williams, Ali Landry, Gina Gershon, Kelly Carlson and Ernie Hudson – December 12, 2009

Season 2
Michael Imperioli, Joan Collins, Donna D'Errico, and Corey Feldman – July 17, 2010
Alice Cooper, Tracey Gold, Fred Dryer, and Kathryn Erbe – July 24, 2010
William Baldwin, Tracy Nelson, Tempestt Bledsoe, and Eric Balfour – July 31, 2010
Paulina Porizkova, Chazz Palminteri, Michael Urie, and Karina Smirnoff – August 7, 2010
Shirley Jones, Lindsay Wagner, Mykelti Williamson and Matthew Settle – August 14, 2010
Jermaine Jackson, Karina Smirnoff, Diane Ladd and Dave Foley – August 21, 2010
Christopher Knight, Carol Alt, Dick Van Patten, Marissa Jaret Winokur and Jerry Lobrow – August 28, 2010
Deborah Gibson, Joe Pantoliano, Kimberley Locke and Willie Garson – September 11, 2010
Laura Prepon, Vince Neil, Connie Stevens and Haylie Duff – September 18, 2010
Daryl Hannah, Maksim Chmerkovskiy, Shanna Moakler and Marilyn Manson – October 30, 2010
Rebecca De Mornay, Michael Rapaport and Margaret Cho – November 6, 2010
Vince Neil, Charisma Carpenter, Cynthia Rowley and Orlando Jones – November 13, 2010
Donny Most, Gena Lee Nolin, Fred Willard and Lolita Davidovich – November 20, 2010
Taylor Hicks, Janine Turner, Charles S. Dutton and Joshua Leonard – December 4, 2010
Shelley Long, Daniel Stern, Gail O'Grady and Matt Sorum – December 11, 2010
Sugar Ray Leonard, Aida Turturro, Larry Manetti and Johnathon Schaech – December 18, 2010
Joey Lawrence, Gabrielle Carteris, John Ventimiglia and Paul Shaffer – January 1, 2011
Cheri Oteri, Corbin Bernsen, John Schneider and Sharon Angela – January 8, 2011

Season 3
Regis Philbin, Harry Hamlin, Ana Gasteyer and Jaime King – June 18, 2011
Bret Michaels, Natasha Henstridge, Penelope Ann Miller and Eva Amurri – June 25, 2011
Jerry Stiller, Mindy McCready, Nick Hogan and Lourdes Benedicto – July 9, 2011
Mindy Cohn, Valerie Harper, Matthew Gray Gubler and Nicole Eggert – July 16, 2011
Best of Special – July 23, 2011
Keshia Knight Pulliam, Ming-Na, Chi McBride and Mia Tyler – July 30, 2011
Brett Butler, Cassandra Peterson, Phil Varone and Ana Gasteyer – August 6, 2011
Beverly D'Angelo, Sally Struthers, and Melissa George – August 13, 2011
Loretta Lynn – August 20, 2011
Alan Thicke, Fairuza Balk, Kevin Pollak and Laila Ali – October 29, 2011
Dyan Cannon, Wendi McLendon-Covey, Quinton Aaron and Bridget Marquardt – November 5, 2011
Joan Osborne, Ahmad Rashad, Mia Tyler and Renée Taylor – November 12, 2011
Chaka Khan, Kristin Bauer and Iqbal Theba – November 19, 2011
Mickey Rooney, Brande Roderick, Eric Mabius and Kim Coles – November 26, 2011
Beverley Mitchell, Mark Curry, Donovan Leitch and Phyllis Diller – December 3, 2011
Susan Olsen, Rita Coolidge, Fairuza Balk and Enrico Colantoni – December 10, 2011
Christopher Atkins, María Conchita Alonso and Scott Patterson – December 17, 2011

Season 4
Cindy Williams, Audrina Patridge, Giancarlo Esposito and Joan Van Ark – June 2, 2012
Billy Dee Williams, Jenna Morasca, Dee Wallace Stone and Kathrine Narducci – June 9, 2012
Erik Estrada, Micah Sloat, Joan Osborne and Reginald VelJohnson – June 16, 2012
Roddy Piper, Skylar Grey and Frank Whaley – June 23, 2012
Aaron Carter, Christopher McDonald, Kaya Jones and David Proval – June 30, 2012
Tito Ortiz, Cary Elwes, Sally Kellerman and Drake Bell – July 7, 2012
Tiffany, Tony Plana and Morgan Brittany – August 4, 2012
Lorenzo Lamas, Charles Shaughnessy and Kristen Renton – August 11, 2012
Tyler Blackburn, Lainie Kazan and Shari Headley – August 18, 2012
Jordan Ladd, Adrienne Barbeau, Kyle Massey, Gigi Cesarè and Brett Cullen – August 25, 2012
Jack Osbourne, Stephen Collins, Aasha Davis and David Lander – September 8, 2012
Erin Moran, Pia Zadora and Michael Beach – September 15, 2012
Diane Neal, Debbie Allen, Kevin Sorbo and Debbie Matenopoulos – September 22, 2012
Titus Welliver, Johnny Gill and Marcus Schenkenberg – October 13, 2012
Biz Markie, Erik Palladino and Rita Rudner – October 20, 2012
Dick Cavett, Monica Keena, Ace Young and Paul Iacono – October 27, 2012
Lewis Black, Meshach Taylor and Samantha Harris – November 3, 2012
Charo, William Mapother, Justin Guarini and Hope Dworaczyk – November 10, 2012
Bill Bellamy, Dawn Wells, Jack Blades and Mary Lambert – November 17, 2012
D. B. Sweeney, Adrian Zmed, Eddie Money and Nicole Leone – November 24, 2012
Linda Blair, Carlos Mencia, Victoria Rowell and Dot-Marie Jones – December 8, 2012
Tracy Scoggins, Fairuza Balk, Della Reese and Patrick Muldoon – December 15, 2012
Jackée Harry, Louie Anderson, Angie Stone and Richard Burgi – January 5, 2013
Patricia Velásquez, Susie Essman and Elya Baskin – January 12, 2013
Lisa Lisa, Bernie Kopell, Enrico Colantoni and Heather McDonald – January 19, 2013
Beverly Johnson, Charlene Tilton and Jimmy Wayne – January 26, 2013
Mariel Hemingway, Kevin Brown and Curtis Armstrong – February 2, 2013

Season 5
George Wendt, Wayne Newton, Ace Frehley and April Mendez – June 1, 2013
Marisa Ramirez, Jimmie Walker, Lisa Vidal and Kate Vernon – June 8, 2013
Shar Jackson, Blair Brown, Esai Morales and John Hensley – June 15, 2013
Coco, Craig Kilborn, Diana DeGarmo and Tommy Davidson – June 22, 2013
Tom Green, Anthony Michael Hall, Brenda Epperson and Jacklyn Zeman – June 29, 2013
Richard Grieco, Ana Ortiz and Barry Bostwick – July 6, 2013
Nadine Velazquez, Burt Ward, Adrianna Costa and Bruce Davison – July 13, 2013
Jillian Barberie, Dan Cortese and Bruce Boxleitner – October 19, 2013
Michael Madsen, Linda Dano, Joanna Cassidy and Rae Dawn Chong – October 26, 2013
Andy Dick, Justin Henry, Nick Turturro and Betsey Johnson – November 2, 2013
Cherie Currie, Joseph Bologna, Diane Farr and Estella Warren – November 9, 2013
Jim Norton, Penny Johnson Jerald, Peter Scolari and Steven Williams – November 16, 2013
Marlee Matlin, Kim Carnes and Robert Carradine – November 23, 2013
Mary Lynn Rajskub, Dennis Christopher, Barbara Steele and Gary Daniels – March 22, 2014
Pam Grier, David Otunga, Max Adler and Golden Brooks – March 29, 2014
Louis Gossett Jr, Carolyn Hennesy, Nathan Morris and Kevin Nash – April 5, 2014
Downtown Julie Brown, Drita D'Avanzo, Jai Rodriguez and Nicholas Brendon – April 12, 2014
Julie White, Roger Bart, Dominique Swain and Thomas Ian Nicholas – April 19, 2014

Season 6
Ice-T and Coco Austin – April 8, 2020
Terry Bradshaw – April 15, 2020
Paula Abdul – April 22, 2020
NeNe Leakes – April 29, 2020
Kelly Osbourne – May 6, 2020
Taye Diggs – May 13, 2020

Celebrity Ghost Stories UK
In 2011, the UK version of BIO broadcast a series of Celebrity Ghost Stories featuring UK celebrities. The show largely follows the same format as the original US version.

Series 1
Terry Nutkins, Yvette Fielding, Nancy Sorrell and Jan Leeming – May 12, 2011
Margi Clarke, Mike Read, Kim Woodburn and Rav Wilding – May 26, 2011
Tina Malone, Jilly Goolden, Edwina Currie and Jeremy Edwards – June 2, 2011
John McCririck, Terri Dwyer, Sarah Cawood and Lembit Öpik – June 9, 2011 
Anne Diamond, Pat Sharp, Amanda Lamb and John Altman – June 16, 2011
Toyah Willcox, Alex Ferns, Adele  and Sue Cook – June 23, 2011

See also
List of ghost films
Famously Afraid, television show on Travel Channel which also features celebrities and their paranormal stories

References

External links

 (2009 – 2014)
 (2019 – present)

2009 American television series debuts
2000s American reality television series
2010s American reality television series
2020s American reality television series
A&E (TV network) original programming
American television series revived after cancellation
English-language television shows
Television series about ghosts
The Biography Channel shows
Paranormal reality television series